This article shows the rosters of all participating teams at the 2018 Montreux Volley Masters in Switzerland.

The Brazilian roster in the 2018 Montreux Volley Masters:

Head coach: José Roberto Lages Guimarães

The Chinese roster in the 2018 Montreux Volley Masters:

Head coach: An Jiajie

The Cameroon roster in the 2018 Montreux Volley Masters:

Head coach: Akono Jean Rene Bekono

The Italian roster in the 2018 Montreux Volley Masters:

Head coach: Mazzanti Davide

The Polish roster in the 2018 Montreux Volley Masters:

The Russian roster in the 2018 Montreux Volley Masters:

The Swiss roster in the 2018 Montreux Volley Masters:

Head coach: Timo Lippuner

The Turkish roster in the 2018 Montreux Volley Masters:

References

2018
Montreux Volley Masters squads
Montreux Volley Masters squads